Igor Tešić (born 3 January 1988) is a male beach volleyball player from Serbia. Tešić and his teammate Stefan Basta represented Serbia at the 2013 Mediterranean Games and won 6th place.

Igor Tešić and Stefan Basta won 7th place at the 2012 CEV Beach Volleyball European Championship – Novi Sad Masters .

References
 

1988 births
Living people
Serbian beach volleyball players
Men's beach volleyball players
Competitors at the 2013 Mediterranean Games
Mediterranean Games competitors for Serbia
21st-century Serbian people